Guinea-Bissau competed at the 2000 Summer Olympics in Sydney, Australia.

Athletics

Men

Women

Wrestling 

Freestyle

References
Official Olympic Reports

Summer Olympics
Nations at the 2000 Summer Olympics
2000